WQXM (1460 kHz) is a commercial AM radio station licensed to Bartow in Central Florida.  It airs a Spanish language Contemporary Hits radio format known as "Ritmo 99.9."  It is owned by Aliuska Leiva Marti, through licensee DRC Broadcasting, Inc.

By day, WQXM broadcasts at 10,000 watts, using a directional antenna.  But to reduce interference to other stations on 1460 AM, WQXM greatly reduces power at night to 155 watts, switching to a non-directional antenna.  The transmitter is on North Maple Avenue near Lyle Parkway in Bartow, Florida.  Programming is also heard on FM translator W260DA at 99.9 MHz.

FM translator
WQXM programming is relayed on an FM translator, which gives listeners for the improved sound of FM stereo.

History
The station went on the air as WRMX on 2004-09-30.  On 2004-10-11, the station changed its call sign to the current WQXM.

References

External links

QXM
QXM
Radio stations established in 2004
Bartow, Florida
2004 establishments in Florida